A prisoner of conscience (POC) is anyone imprisoned because of their race, sexual orientation, religion, or political views. The term also refers to those who have been imprisoned or persecuted for the nonviolent expression of their conscientiously held beliefs.

Most often associated with the human rights organisation Amnesty International, the term was coined by founder Peter Benenson in a 28 May 1961 article ("The Forgotten Prisoners") for the London Observer.

Definition
The article "The Forgotten Prisoners" by Peter Benenson, published in The Observer 28 May 1961, launched the campaign "Appeal for Amnesty 1961" and first defined a "prisoner of conscience".

The primary goal for this year-long campaign, founded by the English lawyer Peter Benenson and a small group of writers, academics and lawyers including Quaker peace activist Eric Baker, was to identify individual prisoners of conscience around the world and then campaign for their release. In early 1962, the campaign had received enough public support to become a permanent organization and was renamed Amnesty International.

In 1995, Amnesty International changed Benenson's original definition to include people "deprived of their liberty... for discriminatory reasons relating to their ethnicity, sexuality, gender, or other identity", and to exclude people who have "advocated hatred". This caused Alexei Navalny's status as a POC to be stripped in February 2021 due to comments he made on migrants in 2007 and 2008 which Amnesty International regarded as "hate speech".

Amnesty International announced "a review of its overall approach to the use of the term 'Prisoner of Conscience'", following the controversy surrounding the use of the term to describe Alexei Navalny, stating, "[a]s an initial interim step, our approach has been refined to not exclude a person from designation as a Prisoner of Conscience solely based on their conduct in the past", and that Navalny has been "re-designate[d]" as a Prisoner of Conscience.

Under British law, Amnesty International was classed as a political organisation and therefore excluded from tax-free charity status. To work around this, the "Fund for the Persecuted" was established in 1962 to receive donations to support prisoners and their families. The name was later changed to the "Prisoners of Conscience Appeal Fund" and is now a separate and independent charity which provides relief and rehabilitation grants to prisoners of conscience in the UK and around the world.

Amnesty International has, since its founding, pressured governments to release those persons it considers to be prisoners of conscience. Governments, conversely, tend to deny that the specific prisoners identified by Amnesty International are, in fact, being held on the grounds Amnesty claims; they allege that these prisoners pose genuine threats to the security of their countries.

The concept of "prisoners of conscience" became a controversy around Nelson Mandela's imprisonment in South Africa 1964. He had initially been adopted as a prisoner of conscience in 1962, when he was sentenced to five years in jail for inciting a strike of African workers. This was reversed after the Rivonia Trial showed that Mandela now had turned to violently opposing the South African regime. The reversal evolved in 1964 into a worldwide debate and a poll among the members of Amnesty International. The overwhelming majority decided to maintain the basic rule, that prisoners of conscience are those who have not used or advocated violence.

The phrase is now widely used in political discussions to describe a political prisoner, whether or not Amnesty International has specifically adopted the case, although the phrase has a different scope and definition than that of political prisoner.

Particular prisoners of conscience

See also
Political prisoner

References

External links
 Amnesty International resources about prisoners of conscience
 Prisoners of Conscience Appeal Fund

 
Imprisonment and detention